Roy Francis McGillicuddy (August 27, 1888 – February 11, 1960), known as Roy Mack, was an American baseball team executive owner who co-owned the Philadelphia Athletics of the American League with his brother Earle Mack from  through .  

Mack was born in Washington, D.C. in 1888, the son of Hall of Fame manager and former Athletics owner Connie Mack and Gertrude Browning Chaffee. His paternal grandparents, Michael McGillicuddy and Mary McKillop, were born in Ireland. He grew up in  Worcester, Massachusetts, where he attended Worcester Academy. 

Roy Mack's baseball career was focused on front office administration and management. After serving as business manager of the Portland Beavers of the Pacific Coast League, which had a working agreement with the Athletics, he joined the Philadelphia front office in 1936 as a vice president. In August 1950, he and Earle Mack became majority owners of the club during a reorganization. But they could not arrest the club's declining performance on the field and deteriorating financial picture. In November 1954, the brothers sold the Athletics to Chicago industrialist Arnold Johnson, who immediately transferred the team to Kansas City, Missouri.  Roy then spent one season, 1955, as a vice president of the Kansas City club before retiring.

He died in Lower Merion Township, Pennsylvania, aged 71.

References

Oakland Athletics owners

1888 births
1960 deaths
Businesspeople from Worcester, Massachusetts
Kansas City Athletics executives
Mack family
Major League Baseball owners
Philadelphia Athletics executives
Philadelphia Athletics owners